George W. Stevens (October 1, 1834 – September 30, 1897) was an American civil engineer and architect practicing in Manchester, New Hampshire, during the nineteenth century.

Life and career
George W. Stevens was born October 1, 1834, in Andover, Massachusetts, to Phinehas Stevens (1800-1864). Phinehas Stevens was a millwright and built the New Mills of the Amoskeag Manufacturing Company in 1841, among other mills in New England.

Stevens is first listed in the Manchester directories in 1866, as a civil engineer. By 1879 he was also noted in the directories as an architect, though he was employed as an architect as early as the late 1860s. He lived in Manchester for about forty years, for eighteen of which he was employed as chief civil engineer for the Amoskeag Manufacturing Company. In 1892 Stevens left Manchester to join Lockwood, Greene & Company as superintendent of construction for their southern mills. He remained in this position for five years, living in the South. Stevens died in Cordova, Alabama, on September 30, 1897.

Personal life
Stevens was married in 1864 to Anna Maria Annan (1837-1927) of Manchester.

Augustus G. Stevens (1829-1901), elder brother of George W., was also an architect and engineer in Manchester, and designed the Hoyt Shoe Factory in 1892.

Legacy
At least three buildings attributed to Stevens have been listed on the United States National Register of Historic Places, and another contributes to a listed historic district.

Works
 Manchester City Library (former), Manchester, New Hampshire (1869–71, demolished)
 Lincoln Street School, Manchester, New Hampshire (1871, demolished)
 Ash Street School, Manchester, New Hampshire (1872–74, NRHP-listed 1975)
 Old Post Office Block, Manchester, New Hampshire (1876, NRHP-listed 1986)
 Central Fire Station, Manchester, New Hampshire (1877, demolished 1971)
 Dunlap Building, Manchester, New Hampshire (1879, NRHP-listed 2004)
 House for George W. Stevens, Manchester, New Hampshire (1879)
 Amory Mill, Amoskeag Millyard, Manchester, New Hampshire (1880)
 Housing for the Amoskeag Manufacturing Company, Manchester, New Hampshire (1881, partially extant)
 Bakersville School, Manchester, New Hampshire (1883, demolished)
 Chimney, Amoskeag Millyard, Manchester, New Hampshire (1883, demolished 1955)
 Peoples' Baptist Church, Manchester, New Hampshire (1888, demolished)

Gallery of works

Notes

References

1834 births
1897 deaths
Architects from New Hampshire
Engineers from New Hampshire
People from Manchester, New Hampshire
People from Andover, Massachusetts